Mahuyar Pearl is a 2023 Burmese drama television series directed by Kyaw Soe Thu starring Aung Yay Chan, May Mi Ko Ko, Hein Yatu, Hnin, Natt Shine Ko, Jue San Thar and Saw La Pyae Won. It is an adaptation of the novel "Midnight Sun of Mahuyar Pearl" by La Min Maung Maung (Pyin Oo Lwin). It began airing on MRTV-4, on February 6, 2023, from Mondays to Fridays at 19:00.

Synopsis
Thet Oo Maung was hungry for his father's love since he was young. Because his father misunderstood his mother and U Myint and thought that he was not his biological son. When Thet Oo Maung came of age, he fell in love with actress May Yadan Maung and married. But he didn't get the happy family life he wanted. The reason is because Mae Yadanar Maung aborted the baby. Thet Oo Maung took pity on May Yadanar Maung and left her behind. May Yadanar Maung apologized repeatedly, but Thet Oo Maung did not let go. One day, Thet U Maung stole Mya Mya Wai and Jimmy's child and adopted him. Thet Oo Maung knew Jimmy thought that he was not his biological son and he did not care for the child. Because Jimmy mistook Mya Mya Wai for his ex-boyfriend Min Naing.

Cast
Aung Yay Chan as Thet Oo Maung
May Mi Ko Ko as Mya Mya Wai
Hein Yatu as Jimmy Htun
Natt Shine Ko as Min Naing
Hnin as May Yadanar Maung
Jue San Thar as Kay Thi
Saw La Lyae Won as Cherry
May Nandar Kyaw as Ma Ma Nwe
Nyein Chan as Dr. Myo Swe
Wyne Shwe Yi as Yadanar
Than Than Soe as Daw Khin Wai
Min Thu as U Myint Thu
Khin Moht Moht Aye as mother of May Yadanar Maung
Eant Min Nyo as Zaw Latt

References

Burmese television series
MRTV (TV network) original programming